John Wayne Shot Me was an indie band from Ammerzoden, the Netherlands.

History
John Wayne Shot Me was formed by Thijs van den Broek in 1998, originally as a one-man recording only project. When his songs received positive reviews in several small underground music magazines, John Wayne Shot Me was asked to perform live. Thijs then decided to form a band with his friends Merijn van Pelt, Geert van Beers and his sister Marieke van den Broek. Soon the band signed to the Belgian label Ines Boukov/62TV Records and many releases and shows all over Europe followed.

Allegedly due to a legal issue about their bandname with the inheritors of actor Marion Michael Morrison, also known as John Wayne, the band decided to split up in December 2006 . They played their last concert in 's-Hertogenbosch, the city where the bandmembers met in highschool.

John Wayne Shot Me was known for their short melodic twisted popsongs about love, technology and monsters. Most songs featured (samples of) toy instruments and outdated gameconsoles. The band released 3 albums and some singles, including a split 7-inch with the Californian band Grandaddy. The band also worked with Kimya Dawson, Julia P Hersheimer, Austin Lace and many others.

Line-up 

Occasionally the following people are mentioned as band members as well:

Selective discography 

Exclusive tracks on compilations:

References 

Dutch indie rock groups
Musical groups established in 1998
Cultural depictions of John Wayne